How Bizarre may refer to:

How Bizarre (album), a 1996 album by the New Zealand musical group OMC
"How Bizarre (song)", 1995 hit single from the OMC album
 How Bizarre: The Story of an Otara Millionaire, 2014 documentary by Stuart Page about OMC lead singer Paul Fuemana
 "How Bizarre", a 2014  episode from season 13 of Canadian teen drama Degrassi

See also